refers to the traditional Māori medicinal practices in New Zealand. Rongoā was one of the Māori cultural practices targeted by the Tohunga Suppression Act 1907, until lifted by the Maori Welfare Act 1962. In the later part of the 20th century there was renewed interest in Rongoā as part of a broader Māori renaissance.

Rongoā can involve spiritual, herbal and physical components. Herbal aspects used plants such as harakeke, kawakawa, rātā, koromiko, kōwhai, kūmarahou, mānuka, tētēaweka and rimu.

References

Further reading
 Mapping the themes of Maori talk about health
 Acknowledging the Māori cultural values and beliefs embedded in rongoā Māori healing
 The future of rongoa Maori: wellbeing and sustainability.
 NEW ZEALAND'S BICULTURALISM AND THE DEVELOPMENT OF PUBLICLY FUNDED RONGOA (TRADITIONAL MAORI HEALING) SERVICES

Māori culture
Traditional medicine